The 2000 Paris–Nice was the 58th edition of the Paris–Nice cycle race and was held from 5 March to 12 March 2000. The race started at the Bois de Vincennes and finished in Nice. The race was won by Andreas Klöden of the Telekom team.

General classification

References

2000
2000 in road cycling
2000 in French sport
March 2000 sports events in France